Ursberg Abbey is a former Premonstratensian monastery, now a convent of the Franciscan St. Joseph's Congregation, situated in the small village of Ursberg in the district of Günzburg, Bavaria.

History
The monastery, dedicated to Saint Peter and Saint John the Evangelist, was founded between 1126 and 1128 by the nobleman Wernher of Schwabegg-Balzhausen. It was the first Premonstratensian foundation in southern Germany. The monastery became an Imperial abbey (Reichsstift) in 1143.

As was usual with early Premonstratensian foundations, this was originally a double monastery, with a separate nunnery, which lasted until at least 1320 or so. Ursberg was very active in its early years in settling other Premonstratensian houses. This was largely due to the energetic prior Grimo, who was later declared Blessed.

In 1126 Roggenburg Abbey was founded. In 1128 Osterhofen near Passau was established, followed in about 1130 by Roggenburg Abbey and in 1135 by Kaisheim Abbey.

The church was built in about 1230. Originally a Romanesque structure, it was refurbished in the Baroque style by the master builder of Wettenhausen Abbey, Josef Dossenberger the younger. The ceiling frescoes by Jakob Fröschle and Konrad Huber also stem from this period.

The Romanesque cross with the attendant figures of the Virgin Mary and John the Evangelist is of especial note. The high altar is by J. Pflaum. The organ was built by Johann Nepomuk Holzhey.

The abbey was dissolved in 1803 in the course of the secularisation of Bavaria. The church became the parish church, and the priest's house and the regional court (Landgericht) of Krumbach were accommodated in the former monastic premises. In 1884 Father Dominikus Ringeisen managed to acquire the buildings, which were by then empty, where he set up a community of sisters for the care of the physically and mentally handicapped, now known as the Dominikus-Ringeisen-Werk. This endeavour developed into the St. Joseph's Congregation of Ursberg, a Franciscan community of about 270 sisters. In Ursberg, along with branches in Maria Bildhausen, the former Holzen Abbey, Pfaffenhausen and Breitbrunn am Ammersee, about 2,500 handicapped people are provided with accommodation and work, care and home.

References

External links

  St. Josefskongregation Ursberg official website
  Klöster in Bayern: Ursberg

Imperial abbeys disestablished in 1802–03
States and territories established in 1143
Monasteries in Bavaria
Premonstratensian monasteries in Germany
Franciscan convents
1120s establishments in Germany
Religious organizations established in the 1120s
Christian monasteries established in the 12th century
Günzburg (district)